Gio Birgitta Petré, née Ann-Marie Birgitta Bengtsdotter Petré (born 1 November 1937), is a Swedish film actress. She appeared in 27 films from 1955 to 1974.

Selected filmography
 Stage Entrance (1956)
 Wild Strawberries (1957)
 Mannequin in Red (1958)
 Rider in Blue (1959)
 Summer and Sinners (1960)
 The Die Is Cast (1960) 
 The Lady in White (1962)
 Loving Couples (1964)
 The Cats (1965)
 The Vicious Circle (1967)
 Fanny Hill (1968)
 Vindingevals (1968)
 Daddy, Darling (1970)

References

External links
 

1937 births
Living people
Swedish film actresses
Actresses from Stockholm